Rubidium chloride is the chemical compound with the formula RbCl. This alkali metal halide salt is composed of rubidium and chlorine, and finds diverse uses ranging from electrochemistry to molecular biology.

Structure
In its gas phase, RbCl is diatomic with a bond length estimated at 2.7868 Å. This distance increases to 3.285 Å for cubic RbCl, reflecting the higher coordination number of the ions in the solid phase.

Depending on conditions, solid RbCl exists in one of three arrangements or polymorphs as determined with holographic imaging:

Sodium chloride (octahedral 6:6)
The sodium chloride (NaCl) polymorph is most common. A cubic close-packed arrangement of chloride anions with rubidium cations filling the octahedral holes describes this polymorph. Both ions are six-coordinate in this arrangement. The lattice energy of this polymorph is only 3.2 kJ/mol less than the following structure's.

Caesium chloride (cubic 8:8)
At high temperature and pressure, RbCl adopts the caesium chloride (CsCl) structure (NaCl and KCl undergo the same structural change at high pressures). Here, the chloride ions form a simple cubic arrangement with chloride anions occupying the vertices of a cube surrounding a central Rb+. This is RbCl's densest packing motif. Because a cube has eight vertices, both ions' coordination numbers equal eight. This is RbCl's highest possible coordination number. Therefore, according to the radius ratio rule, cations in this polymorph will reach their largest apparent radius because the anion-cation distances are greatest.

Sphalerite (tetrahedral 4:4)
The sphalerite polymorph of rubidium chloride has not been observed experimentally. This is consistent with the theory; the lattice energy is predicted to be nearly 40.0 kJ/mol smaller in magnitude than those of the preceding structures.

Synthesis and reaction
The most common preparation of pure rubidium chloride involves the reaction of its hydroxide with hydrochloric acid, followed by recrystallization:
RbOH + HCl → RbCl + H2O

Because RbCl is hygroscopic, it must be protected from atmospheric moisture, e.g. using a desiccator. RbCl is primarily used in laboratories. Therefore, numerous suppliers (see below) produce it in smaller quantities as needed. It is offered in a variety of forms for chemical and biomedical research.

Rubidium chloride reacts with sulfuric acid to give rubidium hydrogen sulfate.

Radioactivity
Every 18 mg of rubidium chloride is equivalent to approximately one banana equivalent dose due to the large fraction (27.8%) of naturally-occurring radioactive isotope rubidium-87.

Uses
Rubidium chloride is used as a gasoline additive to improve its octane number.
Rubidium chloride has been shown to modify coupling between circadian oscillators via reduced photaic input to the suprachiasmatic nuclei. The outcome is a more equalized circadian rhythm, even for stressed organisms.
Rubidium chloride is an excellent non-invasive biomarker. The compound dissolves well in water and can readily be taken up by organisms. Once broken in the body, Rb+ replaces K+ in tissues because they are from the same chemical group. An example of this is the use of a radioactive isotope to evaluate perfusion of heart muscle.
Rubidium chloride transformation for competent cells is arguably the compound's most abundant use. Cells treated with a hypotonic solution containing RbCl expand. As a result, the expulsion of membrane proteins allows negatively charged DNA to bind.
Rubidium chloride has shown antidepressant effects in experimental human studies, in doses ranging from 180 to 720 mg. It purportedly works by elevating dopamine and norepinephrine levels, resulting in a stimulating effect, which would be useful for anergic and apathetic depression.

References

Rubidium compounds
Chlorides
Metal halides
Antidepressants
Stimulants
Alkali metal chlorides
Rock salt crystal structure